Branodunum was an ancient Roman fort to the east of the modern English village of Brancaster in Norfolk. Its Roman name derives from the local Celtic language, and may mean "fort of the raven".

History 
The fort, built in the 230s, became later part of the Saxon Shore fortification system. It was built to guard the Wash approaches and is of a typical rectangular castrum layout. According to the 4th-century document Notitia Dignitatum, the fort was garrisoned by the Equites Dalmatae Brandodunenses ("Dalmatian cavalry of Bran[d]odunum"), although a tile found on the site stamped Cohors I Aquitanorum suggests that its original garrison was the "First cohort from Aquitania". There is possible evidence (burials and grave goods) of later Saxon use of the site.

According to the National Trust notice boards present on the site of the fort, the fort is within a rectangular field to the east of the current village of Brancaster; there is no urban development on the fort's site itself. Urban residential development in the 1970s has covered much of the area to the west of the fort where part of the local 'vicus' (surrounding civilian settlement) was situated.

Location and construction 
The site is bounded by the modern village of Brancaster to the west, and the A149 road to the south. The site is maintained by the National Trust. Free access is possible from the adjoining A149 road or the Norfolk Coastal Walk.

In Roman times, the fort's northern wall lay directly on the seashore, which served as a harbour. Since then, the shoreline has receded, and the fort now lies inland. In front of the wall there was a V-shaped single ditch. The wall thus enclosed an area of 2.56 ha. In typical castrum fashion, the fort had four gates, one on each side. Evidence of the eastern and western gates and of flanking towers survives. Aerial survey has revealed the existence of several buildings in the fort's interior, including the principia. A civilian settlement (vicus) existed on the eastern and northern sides of the fort, which has been dated to the 2nd century AD. Its size would make it one of the largest settlements in the territory of the Iceni tribe. Because the streets of the settlement are not aligned with the layout of the fort, it has been hypothesised that an earlier fort, built of timber, existed at the site, possibly from as early as the revolt of Queen Boudicca in the mid-1st century AD.

Archaeology
The site provided the subject of an episode of archaeological television programme Time Team first broadcast in January 2013. The Time Team made new discoveries which extend the knowledge base beyond that described above. In 2018, archaeological geophysicist John Gater returned to the site with Sumo Survey Services and was able to confirm the outline of the fort and the layout of interior features like barrack rooms and major buildings.

References

Sources

External links

Branodunum | Roman Britain
 Time Team: Brancaster

Saxon Shore forts
Roman fortifications in England
Former populated places in Norfolk
Roman sites in Norfolk
Brancaster